Huangchuan railway station is a railway station in Huangchuan County, Xinyang, Henan, China. It is located at the intersection between the Beijing–Kowloon railway and the Nanjing–Xi'an railway.

The planned Fuyang–Huanggang–Jiujiang section of the Beijing–Hong Kong (Taipei) corridor will stop here.

History

The station opened in 1996 with the Beijing–Kowloon railway. In 2007, it was transferred from the Nanchang Railway Bureau to the Wuhan Railway Bureau.

In 2019 and 2020, the station buildings were enlarged and refurbished.

References

Railway stations in Henan
Railway stations in China opened in 1996